Phyllolepidum is a genus of flowering plants belonging to the family Brassicaceae, native to Italy, the Balkans and Turkey. It contains two established taxa, which have been treated as either two separate species, or as subspecies of a single species
 Phyllolepidum cyclocarpum  (with a disjunct distribution in the mountains of North Macedonia, southern Albania, northern and central Greece, the Taurus Mountains of Anatolia and Turkish Kurdistan)
 Phyllolepidum rupestre  (endemic to the Maiella massif and nearby mountains of the Central Apennines of Italy)

References

Brassicaceae
Brassicaceae genera